Prophantis xanthomeralis is a moth in the family Crambidae. It was described by George Hampson in 1918. It is found in Malawi. It was formerly placed in the Pyraustinae genus Thliptoceras.

References

Moths described in 1918
Spilomelinae